David Aaron Proval (born May 20, 1942) is an American actor, known for his roles as Tony DeVienazo in the Martin Scorsese film Mean Streets (1973), Snooze in The Shawshank Redemption (1994), Siegfried in Four Rooms (1995) and  as Richie Aprile on the HBO television series The Sopranos (1999–2007).

Biography
Proval was born in Brooklyn, New York into a Jewish family, the son of Clara Katz, an actress from Bucharest, Romania. He has appeared in such films as Mean Streets,  The Shawshank Redemption, The Phantom, Mob Queen, Four Rooms, UHF, Innocent Blood, The Siege, The Monster Squad, Bookies, and Balls of Fury, had cameos in The Brady Bunch Movie, and Smokin' Aces, and has had recurring roles in television shows such as Picket Fences, Boomtown and Everybody Loves Raymond. He appeared on Kojak, The Equalizer, Miami Vice, and Friday the 13th: The Series. He appeared in the 14th episode of The West Wing, "Take This Sabbath Day", as Toby Ziegler's rabbi.

In 1977, his voice was heard in the cult animated film WIZARDS, as the robot assassin Necron 99. He also appeared in the 1989 cult film UHF as the Head Thug. In 2004, he played adult twin brothers James and Edward Talley in the Hallmark Channel original movie Murder Without Conviction.

Films

Television

References

External links

HBO Profile - David Proval 

1942 births
Jewish American male actors
American male film actors
American people of Romanian-Jewish descent
American male television actors
American male voice actors
Living people
Male actors from New York City
20th-century American male actors
21st-century American male actors
People from Brooklyn
21st-century American Jews